ReVisions is a 2004 anthology of alternate history short stories. It is edited by Julie E. Czerneda and Isaac Szpindel.

Contents

External links 

2004 anthologies
Alternate history anthologies
DAW Books books